The 2006 NCAA National Collegiate Women's Ice Hockey Tournament involved eight schools playing in single-elimination play to determine the national champion of women's NCAA Division I college ice hockey. It began on March 17, 2006, and ended with the championship game on March 26. The quarterfinals were conducted at the homes of the teams considered to be higher seeds, although no seed was given for either team in two of the games. The Frozen Four was conducted in Minneapolis. A total of seven games were played.

Bracket

Note: * denotes overtime period(s)

Note: The team in italics is the home team in the first round.

References

NCAA Women's Ice Hockey Tournament
Ice hockey in Minnesota
2006 in sports in Minnesota